The eighth and final season of the American animated comedy television series Regular Show, promoted as Regular Show in Space, created by J. G. Quintel, originally aired on Cartoon Network in the United States. Quintel created the series' pilot using characters from his comedy shorts for the canceled anthology series The Cartoonstitute. He developed Regular Show from his own experiences in college. Simultaneously, several of the show's main characters originated from his animated shorts The Naïve Man from Lolliland and 2 in the AM PM. The series was renewed for an eighth season on July 7, 2015. The season ran from September 26, 2016 to January 16, 2017 and was produced by Cartoon Network Studios. 

The series finale included a reference to Quintel's original short “The Naive Man from Lolliland,” in which Pops' original design is created. The episode "The Ice Tape" features the final voice performance of David Ogden Stiers, who died on March 3, 2018.

Development

Production
The series was renewed for an eighth season on July 7, 2015, along with many other Cartoon Network shows. Regular Show is one of two Cartoon Network series ever to get an eighth season, the other being Adventure Time. The release date was announced at San Diego Comic-Con, and the season premiered on September 26, 2016. The writers and storyboard artists for season 8 are Benton Connor, Madeline Queripel, Casey Crowe, Owen Dennis, Minty Lewis, Ryan Pequin, Sam Spina, Gideon Chase, Alex Cline, and newcomer Sean Glaze. In March 2016, Kacie Hermanson was announced as the new main character designer for the season, replacing long-time designer Ben Adams, who left the show after the sixth episode of the season to work on Billy Dilley's Super-Duper Subterranean Summer for Disney XD. Calvin Wong served as supervising director for the season. The story writers for the season are Quintel, Sean Szeles, Gina Ippolito, Patrick Baker, and Matt Price, who is also the story editor, while being produced by Cartoon Network Studios. Szeles also served as supervising producer, while Ryan Slater served as producer. A former writer and storyboard artist Andres Salaff briefly returned to work on the final episode.

After production on the series wrapped up, several crew members continued to work with Quintel on his next series, Close Enough.

Episodes

References

Regular Show seasons
2016 American television seasons
2017 American television seasons
Alien visitations in fiction
Parallel universes in fiction
Fiction about shapeshifting